Ochirtu Khan (died 1676 or 1677) was a nephew of Güshi Khan and a leader of the Khoshut tribe of the Lake Zaisan area. Ochirtu Khan was killed in battle by the Dzungar forces of his son-in-law, Galdan Boshugtu Khan.

1670s deaths
Kalmyk people
Military personnel killed in action
Year of birth unknown